Kokotxas is a traditional Basque fish stew. The dish is made from stewed fish necks / dewlap (normally from a fatty fish like cod or hake) served with a sauce made from white wine, garlic, flour and olive oil. In the Basque Country the dish is served with a green sauce (salsa verde / saltsa berde) made from olive oil, flour, garlic and parsley.

See also
 List of fish dishes
 List of stews

References 

Spanish soups and stews
Basque cuisine
Fish stews